The International Federation of Liberal Youth (IFLRY) is an international liberal youth organization. It consists of a global membership of national youth organizations. These are often but not exclusively affiliated with political parties that are members of Liberal International.

IFLRY holds full member status to Liberal International and the European Youth Forum (YFJ), which operates within the Council of Europe and European Union areas and works closely with both these bodies. Since 2014, IFLRY has held special consultative status to ECOSOC. IFLRY also holds observer status to UNFCCC and has sent delegations to COP since COP15 in Copenhagen in 2009.

History
IFLRY continues the tradition of two predecessors. The first was the World Federation of Liberal and Radical Youth (WFLRY), founded in 1947 in Cambridge, United Kingdom. WFLRY aimed to be a global organization, but mostly had active members in Europe. This led in 1969 to the separate forming of the European Federation of Liberal and Radical Youth (EFLRY). WFLRY was dissolved in 1978.

In 1979, at the EFLRY 6th Congress in Silkeborg, Denmark, EFLRY renamed itself IFLRY International Federation of Liberal and Radical Youth. This marked the start of a global expansion of the organization. The 6th Congress is thus recognized as the founding congress of IFLRY.

In 2001, the organization was renamed into IFLRY – International Federation of Liberal Youth.

Structure
IFLRY's highest body is the General Assembly, which meets at least every year. It adopts IFLRY's political platform, the Manifesto, and decides about IFLRY's activities. These are stated in a two-year Programme of Action. The General Assembly also decides on the federation's policies by adopting resolutions. Furthermore, the General Assembly elects the Bureau and decides upon the budget.

The Executive Committee is composed of one representative from each member organisation and the Bureau. It meets twice a year and takes all policy decisions within the framework of the General Assembly's resolutions.

The IFLRY Bureau consists of a President, a Secretary General, a Treasurer and four Vice-Presidents. The Bureau has the responsibility for IFLRY's day-to-day management and is elected every two years. The IFLRY Bureau appoints an Executive Director who runs the IFLRY secretariat in Berlin.

Bureau 2022-2023
 Bram Roodhart (JoVD), President
 Valentine Martin (IPL), Secretary General
 Sam Hudis (YDA), Treasurer
 Aliona Dobryden (EYU), Vice President
 Rami Hafez (FY), Vice President
 Abdallah Abdoh(FTF), Vice President
 Benjamin Fievet (JR), Vice President

Regional board members:
 Marten Porte (LYMEC, Europe)
 Ivanpal Grewal (CALD Youth, Asia)
 Farah Irqsusi (AYUFD, MENA-region)
 Luyolo Mphithi (ALY, Africa)
 Pedro Urruchurtu (Latin America)

Programmes
A major part of the activities within IFLRY are organized through various programmes. These are the current IFLRY programmes:
 Belarus & Ukraine
 Caucasus
 Climate Change
 Gender Equality
 Free Trade
 Human Rights
 Latin America
 Pool of Trainers
 Libel

Leadership of IFLRY

Member organizations

Regional organizations

National organizations

Africa

Americas

Asia

Europe

Oceania
No national member organizations at the moment.

See also
 Liberalism
Liberal International
 Liberalism worldwide
 List of liberal parties
 LYMEC, the European Liberal Youth, related to the European Liberal, Democrat and Reform Party

References

External links
 International Federation of Liberal Youth (IFLRY) official site
 European Liberal Youth (LYMEC) official site

International liberal organizations
Liberal International
Youth wings of political parties
Youth empowerment organizations
Political organizations established in 1979